The Shale Butte Wilderness Study Area is a Bureau of Land Management wilderness study area (WSA) in Lincoln County, Idaho. The WSA is located to the south of Craters of the Moon National Monument and Preserve.

Shale Butte itself is located in the northeast corner of the WSA.  It is not composed of shale, but basalt lava of Pleistocene age.  The lava extends to the south from the butte to cover the eastern WSA.

The WSA is accessible only by unimproved roads and jeep trails, or by hiking.

To the north is Sand Butte Wilderness Study Area.

External links
Volcanic landscape, top of plateau in southeastern Shale Butte Wilderness Area

References

Protected areas of Lincoln County, Idaho
Protected areas established in 1992
Bureau of Land Management areas in Idaho
1992 establishments in Idaho